The unspotted yellow-sided ctenotus (Ctenotus ingrami)  is a species of skink found in Queensland and New South Wales in Australia.

References

ingrami
Reptiles described in 1982
Taxa named by Greg V. Czechura
Taxa named by John C. Wombey